Zuzana Kultánová (born 1986) is a Czech novelist. For her debut novel, Augustin Zimmermann, she received the 2017 Jiří Orten Award given to the author of a work of prose or poetry who is no older than 30 at the time of the work's completion.

Life and career 
Zuzana Kultánová studied Czech language and literature at the University of Ostrava. Her debut novel, Augustin Zimmerman, was published by Kniha Zlín in 2016. It won the 2017 Jiří Orten Award. The novel was also nominated for the literary prize Magnesia Litera in the "Discovery of the Year" category.

Awards 
 2017 Jiří Orten Award

References 

Living people
1986 births
21st-century Czech novelists
Czech women novelists
21st-century Czech women writers